Thomas Joseph McCormack (31 January 1888 – 2 September 1959) was an Irish hurler. Usually lining out as a half-back, he was a member of the Kilkenny team that won All-Ireland Championship titles in 1909, 1911 and 1912.

McCormack played his club hurling with Erin's Own, however, he enjoyed little success during his brief club career.

After being selected for the Kilkenny senior team in 1909, McCormack was a regular member of the team at various times over the following four championship seasons. He won his first Leinster medal in his debut season in 1909 before later winning his first All-Ireland medal after Kilkenny's defeat of Tipperary in the final. McCormack won further Leinster and All-Ireland medals in 1911 and 1912.

McCormack died on 2 September 1959.

Honours

Kilkenny
All-Ireland Senior Hurling Championship (3): 1909, 1911, 1912
Leinster Senior Hurling Championship (3): 1909, 1911, 1912

References

1888 births
1959 deaths
Erin's Own (Kilkenny) hurlers
Kilkenny inter-county hurlers
All-Ireland Senior Hurling Championship winners